QR (also known as Quiet Riot, Quiet Riot IV, or QR IV) is the sixth studio album released on October 21, 1988  by the American heavy metal band Quiet Riot. The album featured a major line-up change. Singer and founding member Kevin DuBrow had been fired before the recording sessions began, and replaced by Rough Cutt vocalist Paul Shortino. The band had fired DuBrow mainly because of comments he was making to the metal press about Quiet Riot's supposed superiority over other bands, which strained friendships that members of Quiet Riot had with those bands. Shortino's hiring was not the only line-up change, as Chuck Wright had quit the band and was replaced by Sean McNabb.  This left the album with the distinction of being the only Quiet Riot release without DuBrow on vocals, or any other original members (until 1993's Terrified).

Due to the confusion over the album's proper title, Paul Shortino was asked in 2015 on Twitter what the proper name of the album was, and he replied back that the name is simply "QR".

Reaction to the album at the time was tepid, but did manage to attract a bit more interest than the previous album. However, the only major single spawned from the album, "Stay with Me Tonight" made a small dent in the pop charts and the video received moderate airplay on MTV in late 1988, but nothing comparable to the impact that previous albums had.

The album also featured studio musicians Jimmy Waldo (keyboards) and Jimmy Johnson, who played bass on "Stay with Me Tonight" and "Coppin' a Feel". The album was produced by Spencer Proffer, who had produced every Quiet Riot U.S. released album up to this point.

Paul Shortino and Sean McNabb later played together on Rough Cutt's Sneak Peek EP.

The album was remastered on CD in 2010 by Jon Astley.

Critical reception

Upon its release, Gary Blockus of The Morning Call wrote: "Now that Dubrow is gone, Quiet Riot is finally able to showcase its true talent. Shortino is a cross between a soulful Robert Plant and David Lee Roth, but in no way is a Kingdom Clone. One listen will tell you this is atypical Quiet Riot. Dubrow's departure was a gift for this band." John C. Evosevic of The Pittsburgh Press wrote: "Shortino possesses an expressive, controlled baritone akin to Whitesnake's David Coverdale, but more raspy. He contributes to the songwriting and brings into the band a tougher, bluesier, heavier sound. Thankfully gone with Dubrow are the dopey teen anthems. This album is a pleasant surprise. Although [it] sounds tentative in spots, on the whole it is filled with smart, mature heavy rock."

Janiss Garza of the Los Angeles Times wrote: "This smoky, moody LP bears little relation to the bold, brash feel imparted by ex-frontman Kevin DuBrow. New singer Paul Shortino's passion-soaked vocals surround the melodic, often contemplative songs on this ballad-heavy album." Dave Gattinger of The Leader-Post commented: "Quiet Riot is back, and may have found the sound to climb back to the top. Shortino has brought some heart and soul in addition to rough and ripping vocals reminiscent of Aerosmith's Steven Tyler."

Billboard wrote: "Absence of former vocalist Kevin DuBrow is at least partially felt by this once-platinum metal band. New vocalist Paul Shortino tries hard, but album's general anonymity - along with songs' lack of pop hooks - does not bode well." Barbara Jaeger of The Record commented: "The changes [to the line-up of the band] haven't resulted in any improvement. Quiet Riot is still a run-of-the-mill metal band, long on heavy metal cliches and short on originality."

In a retrospective review, Barry Weber of AllMusic commented: "Shortino sounds competent, but overall he lacks the general charisma of Dubrow. The real problem with the album, however, is the songs themselves, which are loaded with unmemorable lyrics and melodies. The performances on QR make the album horribly faceless; the record shows a once-popular rock group trying to retain their glory days with a handful of disgustingly generic material."

Track listing

Personnel

Quiet Riot
Paul Shortino - lead and backing vocals
Carlos Cavazo - guitars, backing vocals
Sean McNabb - bass, backing vocals
Frankie Banali - drums, percussion

Additional musicians
Jimmy Waldo - keyboards, backing vocals
Jimmy Johnson - bass on “Stay With Me Tonight” & ”Coppin' A Feel”

Production
Spencer Proffer - producer
Hanspeter Huber, Alex Woltman, Jeff Clark - engineer, mixing
Steve Hall - mastering
Hugh Syme - art direction

Charts

References 

1988 albums
Quiet Riot albums
Pasha Records albums